Rudgea is a genus of plant in the family Rubiaceae.

Species include:
 Rudgea crassifolia Zappi & E.Lucas
 Rudgea obesiflora Standl.
 Rudgea parquioides (Cham.) Müll.Arg.
 Rudgea stenophylla (Krause) Standl.

The name was given by Richard Anthony Salisbury to honour Edward Rudge in 1806.

References

External links 
 Rudgea tayloriae (Rubiaceae), an Unusual New Species from the Eastern Slopes of the Venezuelan Andes Gerardo Aymard C., L. J. Dorr and Nidia Cuello Novon Vol. 9, No. 3 (Autumn, 1999), pp. 315–317

 
Rubiaceae genera
Taxonomy articles created by Polbot